Nationality words link to articles with information on the nation's poetry or literature (for instance, Irish or France).

Events
 April – First issue of o•blék: a journal of language arts (pronounced "oblique") is published in the United States, founded by Peter Gizzi who co-edits it with Connell McGrath. The magazine stops publishing in 1993.
 August 30 – Poets Paul Muldoon and Jean Hanff Korelitz marry.
 October 16 – Charles Bukowski, fictionalised as alter ego Henry Chinaski, becomes the subject of the film Barfly starring Mickey Rourke released today.
 October – Tony Harrison's poem "V" is broadcast in a filmed version on Channel 4 television in the United Kingdom.
 Joseph Brodsky, a Russian exile who has become a United States citizen, resigns his membership in the American Academy of Arts and Letters in protest over the honorary membership of the Russian poet Evgenii Evtushenko, regarded by Brodsky as a Soviet "yes man".
 Russian poet Anna Akhmatova's Requiem, an elegy about suffering of Soviet people under the Great Purge, composed 1935–61 and first published in the West in 1963, is first openly published complete in book form in the Soviet Union.
 In his 'Notes on the New Formalism', Dana Gioia writes: "the real issues presented by American poetry in the Eighties will become clearer: the debasement of poetic language; the prolixity of the lyric; the bankruptcy of the confessional mode; the inability to establish a meaningful aesthetic for new poetic narrative and the denial of a musical texture in the contemporary poem. The revival of traditional forms will be seen then as only one response to this troubling situation."
 The Dolmen Press in Portlaoise, Ireland, founded in 1951 to provide a publishing outlet for Irish poetry, ceases operations after the death of founder Liam Miller.

Works published in English
Listed by nation where the work was first published and again by the poet's native land, if different; substantially revised works listed separately:

Canada
 Patrick Lane, Selected Poems
 Irving Layton, Fortunate Exile. Toronto: McClelland and Stewart. .
 Irving Layton, Final Reckoning: Poems, 1982-1986. Oakville, Ontario: Mosaic Press.
 Dennis Lee, The Difficulty of Living on Other Planets. Toronto: Macmillan.
 Gwendolyn MacEwen, Afterworlds. Toronto: McClelland and Stewart. 
 Don McKay, Sanding Down the Rocking Chair on a Windy Night
 Raymond Souster, The Eyes of Love. Ottawa: Oberon Press.
 George Woodcock:
Beyond the Blue Mountains, An Autobiography, Markham: Fitzhenry & Whiteside, Canada
Northern Spring: The Flowering of Canadian Literature, Vancouver: Douglas & McIntyre, scholarship

India, in English
 Keki Daruwalla, Landscapes ( Poetry in English ), Delhi: Oxford University Press
 Dom Moraes, Collected Poems 1957-1987 ( Poetry in English ) 
 Jayanta Mahapatra, Selected Poems ( Poetry in English ), New Delhi: Oxford University Press
 Bruce King, editor, Modern Indian Poetry in English - Historical Perspective (first edition), Delhi: Oxford University Press (anthology)

Ireland
 Ciarán Carson: The Irish for No, including "Cocktails", Oldcastle: The Gallery Press Wake Forest University Press, Irish poet published in the United Kingdom and the United States
 Michael Coady, Oven Lane, Oldcastle: The Gallery Press, 
 Paul Durcan, Going Home to Russia, Belfast: The Blackstaff Press
 Eamon Grennan, What Light There Is, including "Totem" and "Four Deer", Oldcastle: The Gallery Press
 Michael Hartnett, A Necklace of Wrens, including "Sneachta Gealai '77" and "Moonsnow '77", Oldcastle: The Gallery Press
 Seamus Heaney, The Haw Lantern, Faber & Faber, Northern Ireland native at this time living in the United States
 Thomas Kinsella, Out of Ireland, Irish poet published in the  United Kingdom
 Paul Muldoon, Meeting the British, including "Something Else", Faber and Faber, Irish poet published in the United Kingdom
 Tom Paulin, Fivemiletown, Northern Irish poet published in the  United Kingdom

New Zealand
 Fleur Adcock (New Zealand poet who moved to England in 1963), The Faber Book of 20th Century Women's Poetry, edited by Fleur Adcock. London and Boston: Faber and Faber
 Janet Charman, 2 deaths in 1 night: poems, Auckland: New Women's Press
 Allen Curnow, Look Back Harder: Critical Writings 1935–1984 (Auckland University Press), edited by Peter Simpson, criticism
 Kendrick Smithyman, Are You Going to the Pictures?
 Ian Wedde, Driving into the Storm: Selected Poems, New Zealand

Anthologies in New Zealand
 Murray Edmond and Mary Paul, editors, The New Poets
 V. O'Sullivan, editor, Anthology of 20th Century New Zealand Poetry, anthology, third edition
 Mark Williams, Caxton Press Anthology of New Zealand Poetry

United Kingdom
 Peter Ackroyd, The Diversions of Purley, and Other Poems
 Fleur Adcock (New Zealand poet who moved to England in 1963), The Faber Book of 20th Century Women's Poetry, edited by Fleur Adcock. London and Boston: Faber and Faber
 Alan Brownjohn, The Old Flea-Pit
 Ciarán Carson: The Irish for No, Gallery Press, Wake Forest University Press, Irish poet published in the United Kingdom
 David Constantine, Madder
 Carol Ann Duffy, Selling Manhattan
 Gavin Ewart, Late Pickings
 U. A. Fanthorpe, A Watching Brief
 James Fenton, Partingtime Hall (written with John Fuller, 1987), Viking / Salamander Press, comical poems,
 Elaine Feinstein, Badlands, Hutchinson
 Philip Gross, Cat's Whisker
 Tony Harrison, Anno Forty-Two
 Seamus Heaney, The Haw Lantern, Faber & Faber, Northern Ireland native at this time living in the United States
 John Heath-Stubbs, Cat's Parnassus, Aldgate Press, 
 Kathleen Jamie, The Way We Live
 P. J. Kavanagh, Presence
 Thomas Kinsella, Out of Ireland, Irish poet published in the United Kingdom
 Blake Morrison, The Ballad of the Yorkshire Ripper
 Andrew Motion, Natural Causes
 Paul Muldoon, Meeting the British, Irish poet published in the United Kingdom
 Sean O'Brien, The Frighteners (Bloodaxe)
 Tom Paulin, Fivemiletown, Northern Ireland poet published in the United Kingdom
 Fiona Pitt-Kethley, Private Parts
 Ruth Pitter, A Heaven to Find
 Peter Porter, The Automatic Oracle
 Peter Redgrove:
 In the Hall of the Saurians, shortlisted for the Whitbread Prize for Poetry in 1987
 The Moon Disposes: Poems 1954-1987
 Carol Rumens, Plato Park
 C. H. Sisson, God Bless Karl Marx
 R.S. Thomas, Welsh Airs
 Anthony Thwaite, Letter from Tokyo
 Charles Tomlinson, The Return
 John Wain, Open Country

Criticism, scholarship and biography in the United Kingdom
 Elaine Feinstein, A Captive Lion: The Life of Marina Tsvetayeva, Hutchinson

United States
 A.R. Ammons, Sumerian Vistas
 Maya Angelou, Now Sheba Sings the Song
 Gloria Anzaldúa, Borderlands/La Frontera: The New Mestiza, autobiography, poetry, political, historical and cultural analysis
 John Ashbery, April Galleons
 Marvin Bell, New and Selected Poems, Athenaeum
 Gwendolyn Brooks, Blacks
 Amy Clampitt, Archaic Figure
 Jorie Graham, The End of Beauty
 Seamus Heaney, The Haw Lantern, Faber & Faber, Northern Ireland native at this time living in the United States
 Paul Hoover, The Figures
 Salma Khadra Jayyusi, editor, Modern  Arabic Poetry: An Anthology, Columbia University Press
 Lincoln Kirstein, The Poems of Lincoln Kirstein (Atheneum) 
 Harry Mathews, a collection
 Robert McDowell, Quiet Money
 William Meredith, Partial Accounts: New and Selected Poems (winner of the 1988 Pulitzer Prize)
 George Frederick Morgan, Poems: New and Selected, University of Illinois Press
 Mary Oliver, Provincetown (limited edition with woodcuts by Barnard Taylor)
 Gregory Orr, a collection
 Octavio Paz, Collected Poems, 1957–1987, English translation from Spanish
 Ezra Pound and Louis Zukofsky, Pound/Zukofsky: Selected Letters of Ezra Pound and Louis Zukofsky, edited by Barry Ahearn (Faber & Faber)
 Mark Rudman, By Contraries and other poems
 W.D. Snodgrass, Selected Poems: 1957-1987
 Rosmarie Waldrop, The Reproduction of Profiles (New Directions)
 Theodore Weiss, a collection
 C.K. Williams, Flesh and Blood
 Jay Wright, Selected Poems
 Stephen Yenser, The Consuming Myth: The Work of James Merrill, criticism, scholarship

Other in English
 Edward Brathwaite, X/Self, Jamaica
 Les Murray, The Daylight Moon, Australia

Works published in other languages

Denmark
 Klaus Høeck, Blackberry Winter, with Asger Schnack,; publisher: Gyldendal; Denmark
 Klaus Rifbjerg, Byens tvelys ("Twilight of the City"), Denmark
 Søren Ulrik Thomsen, New Poems

French language

Canada, in French
 Jean Royer:
 Depuis l'amour: Poème, Montréal: l'Hexagone / Paris: La Table rase
 Le Québec en poésie, Saint-Laurent: Lacombe
 La poésie québécoise contemporaine (anthologie), Montréal: l'Hexagone/Paris: La Découverte; anthology

France
 Yves Bonnefoy:
 Ce qui fut sans lumière
 Récits en rêve
 Abdellatif Laabi, translator, Autobiographie du voleur de feu, translated from the original Arabic of Abdelwahab al-Bayati into French; Paris: Unesco/Actes Sud

India
Listed in alphabetical order by first name:
 Chandrakanta Murasingh, Haping Garingo Chibuksa Ringo, Agartala: Shyamlal Debbarma, Kokborok Sahitya Sanskriti Samsad; India, Kokborok-language
 Jayant Kaikini, Shravana Madhyahna, Sagar, Karnataka: Akshara Prakashana, Indian, Kannada-language
 K. Satchidanandan, Ivanekkoodi, ("Him, too"); Malayalam-language
 Nirendranath Chakravarti, Ghumiye Porar Aage, Kolkata: Ananda Publishers; Bengali-language
 Rituraj, Surat Nirat, Jaipur: Panchscheel Prakashan; Hindi-language
 Vasant Abaji Dahake, Shubha-vartaman; Marathi-language

Other languages
 Juliusz Erazm Bolek, Miniatury; Poland
 Christoph Buchwald, general editor, and Jürgen Becker, guest editor, Luchterhand Jahrbuch der Lyrik 1987/88 ("Luchterhand Poetry Yearbook 1987/88"), publisher: Luchterhand Literaturverlag; anthology; Germany
 Odysseus Elytis, Κριναγόρας ("Krinagoras"), Greece
 Ndoc Gjetja, Poezi ("Poetry"); Albania
 Hamid Ismailov, Сад ("Garden") Uzbek language
 Czesław Miłosz, Kroniki ("Chronicles"); Paris: Instytut Literacki; Poland
 Nizar Qabbani, Love Shall Remain, Sir, Syrian, Arabic-language
 M. Swales, editor, German Poetry, anthology with poems in German
 Maire Mhac an tSaoi, An Cion go Dti Seo, including "Caoineadh" and "Ceathruinti Mhaire Ni Ogain", Gaelic-language, Ireland

Awards and honors

Australia
 C. J. Dennis Prize for Poetry: Lily Brett, The Auschwitz Poems
 Kenneth Slessor Prize for Poetry: Philip Hodgins, Blood and Bone
 Mary Gilmore Prize: Jan Owen - Boy with Telescope

Canada
 Gerald Lampert Award: Rosemary Sullivan, The Space a Name Makes
 Archibald Lampman Award: Christopher Levenson, Arriving at Night
 1987 Governor General's Awards: Gwendolyn MacEwan, Afterworlds (English); Fernand Ouellette, Les Heures
 Pat Lowther Award: Heather Spears, How to Read Faces
 Dorothy Livesay Poetry Prize: Diana Hartog, Candy from Strangers
 Prix Émile-Nelligan: Michael Delisle, Fontainebleau and Élise Turcotte, La voix de Carla

United Kingdom
 Cholmondeley Award: Wendy Cope, Matthew Sweeney, George Szirtes
 Commonwealth Prize for Poetry: Edward Brathwaite of Jamaica
 Eric Gregory Award: Peter McDonald, Maura Dooley, Stephen Knight, Steve Anthony, Jill Maughan, Paul Munden

United States
 Agnes Lynch Starrett Poetry Prize: David Rivard, Torque
 Aiken Taylor Award for Modern American Poetry: Howard Nemerov
 AML Award for poetry to Robert A. Christmas for "Self-Portrait as Brigham Young"
 Frost Medal: Robert Creeley / Sterling Brown
 Poet Laureate Consultant in Poetry to the Library of Congress: Richard Wilbur
 Pulitzer Prize for Poetry: Rita Dove, Thomas and Beulah
 Ruth Lilly Poetry Prize: Philip Levine
 Whiting Awards: Mark Cox, Michael Ryan
 William Carlos Williams Award: Alan Shapiro, Happy Hour
 Fellowship of the Academy of American Poets: Josephine Jacobsen and Alfred Corn

Births
 Penny Boxall, British poet

Deaths

Birth years link to the corresponding "[year] in poetry" article:
 January 14 – Ewart Milne, 83 (born 1903), Irish poet and radical
 February 22 – Glenway Wescott, 85 (born 1901), American novelist and poet, from a stroke
 June 22 – John Hewitt, 79 (born 1907), Irish poet
 August 23 – Samar Sen, 70 (born 1916), Bengali poet and journalist
 September 11 – Ladislav Stehlík (born 1908), Czech poet, writer and painter
 September 16 – Howard Moss, 65 (born 1922), poetry editor of The New Yorker, from a heart attack
 November 6 – John Logan (born 1923), American poet
 November 29 – Gwendolyn MacEwen, 46 (born 1941) Canadian poet and novelist, alcohol-related
 December 29 – Jun Ishikawa 石川淳 pen name of Ishikawa Kiyoshi, Ishikawa, 88 (born 1899), Japanese, Shōwa period modernist author, translator and literary critic
 Also – Vaughan Morgan (born 1907), New Zealand shepherd-poet

See also

Poetry
List of years in poetry
List of poetry awards

Notes

20th-century poetry
Poetry
1987 poems